Corporate liberalism is a thesis in United States historiography and a tool for its open door imperialism in which the corporate elite become "both the chief beneficiaries of and the chief lobbyists for the supposedly anti-business regulations". The idea is that both owners of corporations as well as high up government officials came together to become the class of elites. The elite class then conspires (or less maliciously, the system motivates the elite) to keep power away from the low or middle class. Presumably, to avoid the risk of revolution from the poor and powerless and to avoid the realization of class conflict, the elite have the working class pick sides in a mock conflict between business and state.

One of the major influences was Adolf A. Berle (1895–1971). Ellis Hawley states that Berle:
became a leading articulator and shaper of what later scholars would call "Corporate liberalism." In The Modern Corporation and Private Property, [1932] he not only documented the rise of a managerial elite but set forth the possibility of its becoming a "neutral technocracy" imbued with an overriding sense of social responsibility and public trusteeship.

Overview 
Corporate liberalism's principal text is James Weinstein's The Corporate Ideal in the Liberal State, 1900-1918.

Carl Oglesby describes corporate liberalism as a cooperation between those with the most military power and those with the most industrial power. Oglesby suggests that "corporate liberalism...performs for the corporate state a function quite like what the Church once performed for the feudal state. It seeks to justify its burdens and protect it from change".

Roderick T. Long writes similarly that state and corporate power have a symbiotic relationship. Long writes about the alleged realizations of corporate liberalism during the 1960s, the realizations that the business class was hardly a "persecuted minority" and that the state hardly a "bulwark of the poor against the plutocracy".

Weinstein's idea of corporate liberalism should not be confused with Ellis W. Hawley's use of the term (Daniel T. Rodgers noted that Hawley's use of "corporate liberalism" was more a description of liberal corporatism than anything else). It should not also be confused with the concepts developed by Martin J. Sklar, who invented the term "corporate liberalism" in an article on Woodrow Wilson first published in 1960 when he was in graduate school in history at the University of Wisconsin. Sklar published the essay in Studies on the Left, where he and James Weinstein were co-editors. Sklar's writing about corporate liberalism was a major influence on Weinstein's thinking (which Weinstein himself acknowledged in the preface to his book, The Corporate Ideal in the Liberal State). Arguing that the rise of the large corporation "as the dominant mode of business enterprise" was the result of a concerted effort by capitalists and like-minded political leaders and intellectuals, Sklar wrote that corporate liberalism was the "bourgeois Yankee cousin of modern European and English social democracy".

Sklar subsequently refined and developed the corporate liberal concept in a 1988 book, The Corporate Reconstruction of American Capitalism, which significantly differed from Weinstein's interpretation. On pages 34–35, Sklar defined corporate liberalism as the ideology of the political movement that accomplished the corporate reconstruction of the United States political-economic order on the basis of a mutual adjustment between corporate capitalism and the American liberal tradition. In keeping with that tradition, corporate liberalism upheld the corporate administered market and the rise of regulatory government, but not a "corporate state" or a statist command system. Sklar did not see corporate liberalism as simply the ideology of corporate capitalists, but rather as a broad cross-class ideology "expressing the inter-relations of corporate capitalists, political leaders, intellectuals, proprietary capitalists, professionals, and reformers, workers and trade union leaders, populists, and socialists—all of those who could, to a greater or lesser extent, identify their outlook or their interest in administered markets and government regulation, with the rise, legitimation, and institutionalization of the corporate capitalist order".

According to Sklar's account, corporate liberalism was not a monolithic ideology, but unfolded in several major political variants that there were at once "mutually complimentary and in conflict with one another". On the left, they were Theodore Roosevelt's "statist-tending corporate liberalism"; on the center-left, Woodrow Wilson's "regulatory corporate liberalism"; and on the center-right, William Howard Taft's "minimalist regulatory corporate liberalism". Sklar continued saying: "It was from this three-way progressive split that sprang the major divisions of twentieth-century American politics with respect to political-economic policy formation".

Other historians who advocate similar theories of United States history include Gabriel Kolko and Murray Rothbard. The thesis of corporate liberalism has similarities with the ideas of the organizational synthesis school of Alfred D. Chandler Jr., Samuel P. Hays, Robert Wiebe and Louis Galambos.

Notes

References 
 James Weinstein (1968). The Corporate Ideal in the Liberal State.
 Daniel T. Rodgers (December 1982). "In Search of Progressivism". Reviews in American History.
 Martin J. Sklar (1988). The Corporate Reconstruction of American Capitalism, 1890-1916: The Market, The Law, and Politics. New York: Cambridge University Press.
 Martin J. Sklar, "Woodrow Wilson and the Political-Economy of Modern United States Liberalism". Studies on the Left. 1:3 (Fall 1960). Reprinted in Martin J. Sklar (1992). The United States as a Developing Country. Cambridge University Press. pp. 102–142.

Corporatism
Historiography
Liberalism